The Point Sherman Light was a lighthouse located  north of Juneau, Alaska, along the east side of Lynn Canal, eight miles (13 km) south of Eldred Rock Light. It is no longer standing.

History
Construction was completed in 1904 and the light was first lit on October 18, 1904. The original light was reduced to a minor light shortly before 1917. In 1932, the station was transferred to the Forest Service and replaced by a nearby buoy. A dayboard and a light were placed on the site of the original light in 1981.

See also

 List of lighthouses in the United States

References

External links
 
 Lighthouse Friends — Point Sherman Lighthouse
 

Lighthouses completed in 1904
Transportation buildings and structures in Juneau, Alaska
Lighthouses in Alaska